Indonesia–Solomon Islands relations refers to foreign relations between Indonesia and Solomon Islands. Solomon Islands has opened their embassy in Jakarta since August 2014, while Indonesian embassy in Port Moresby is also accredited to Solomon Islands. Indonesia is a gateway for Pacific countries to enter the ASEAN and Asian region, while Indonesia wish to increase its influence in Pacific region. Both countries are the members of Melanesian Spearhead Group (MSG).

High level visits
Solomon Islands Prime Minister Gordon Darcy Lilo visited Indonesia in August 2013.

Economic relations
Bilateral trade relations saw an average annual increase of 17.28 percent . In 2012, the trade volume was at $15.88 million, with Indonesia posting a $9.1 million surplus. The Solomon Islands also works with Indonesia in the fields of energy, fishing, development, media and culture.

Issues
In 2016, the bilateral relations worsen as during United Nations General Assembly, Solomon Islands Prime Minister Manasseh Sogavare alleged the human rights violations in the Indonesian provinces of Papua and West Papua, and also push for the independence of the said provinces. Solomon Island pushed this issue together with Vanuatu, Nauru, the Marshall Islands, Tuvalu and Tonga. Indonesia strongly rejected this accusation and accused these countries of interfering with its domestic affairs and Indonesia's national sovereignty. Indonesia saw this statements as politically motivated to support separatist groups notorious for its terrorist attacks. Indonesia in turn slams Solomon Islands and Vanuatu on their own domestic human rights problems.

See also 
 Foreign relations of Indonesia
 Foreign relations of Solomon Islands

References 

Solomon Islands
Bilateral relations of the Solomon Islands